Cascabel may refer to:

 Cascabel (artillery), a subassembly of a muzzle-loading cannon
 Cascabel chili, a small, round chili pepper
 Cascabel, a Shuttle Loop roller coaster at Chapultepec Park in Mexico City
 Spanish common name for Crotalus durissus, a venomous South American rattlesnake
 Cascabel, Arizona, an area along the San Pedro River north of Benson, Arizona
 César Cascabel, a novel by Jules Verne